"Love Will Find a Way" is a song from the 1998 Disney film The Lion King II: Simba's Pride, and written by Jack Feldman and Tom Snow. In the film, the song is sung by Liz Callaway and Gene Miller. In the end credits, a pop version is performed by Heather Headley and Kenny Lattimore. Both versions were featured on the album Return to Pride Rock: Songs Inspired by Disney's The Lion King II: Simba's Pride, while the pop version was also released as a single.

Context 
The song is sung by Kovu and Kiara, who despite being from opposing tribes, fall in love. Kovu has just been driven out of the Pride Lands due to being falsely accused of a crime. They sing about how their love will conquer all opposition and ultimately bring them together again.

Reception 
The New York Times called it a "detachable...mawkish...generic-sounding ballad", and disliked the blight against Kiara's character of not being "brave and strong and smart" that is included in the song's lyrics. However the newspaper added that the line does call to attention her "colorless, indistinct character" where she lacks the cleverness of Belle and the will of Ariel. The Disney Song Encyclopedia describes it as a "romantic ballad" about how love can overcome all obstacles. Bustle compared the line "Somewhere in my secret heart, I know love will find a way" to the work of Pablo Neruda. Geeks Of Doom negatively compared the song to The Lion Kings "Can You Feel the Love Tonight", but said the "overlooked" and "forgotten" song was a "touching" musical moment from the film about the "challenges of making relationships work" in the face of hurdles. AllMusic deemed the song a "favourite". Metro controversially deemed the tune Disney's 5th best song, positively comparing it to the "boring" and artificial "Can You Feel The Love Tonight" commenting that the "romantic" tune "tugs at the heartstrings in a much more meaningful way".

As of April 2017, the song is the 15th most streamed Disney song on Deezer, the second song from The Lion King franchise on the list after "Circle of Life".

MsMojo ranked the song 8th place in their "Top 10 Best Lion King Songs" video, commenting that "while the scenery is simple throughout the song, it's still quite captivating and fitting for the message it evokes."

References 

1990s ballads
Songs from The Lion King (franchise)
1998 songs
1998 singles
Kenny Lattimore songs
Liz Callaway songs
Love themes
Songs written by Tom Snow
Songs with lyrics by Jack Feldman (songwriter)
Male–female vocal duets
Walt Disney Records singles